Kang Lung Wang is recognized as the discoverer of chiral Majorana fermions by IUPAP. 
Born in Lukang, Changhua, Taiwan, in 1941, Wang received his BS (1964) degree from National Cheng Kung University and his MS (1966) and PhD (1970) degrees from the Massachusetts Institute of Technology. In 1970 to 1972 he was the Assistant Professor at MIT. From 1972 to 1979, he worked at the General Electric Corporate Research and Development Center as a physicist/engineer. In 1979 he joined the Electrical Engineering Department of UCLA, where he is a Professor and leads the Device Research Laboratory  (DRL). He served as Chair of the Department of Electrical Engineering at UCLA from 1993 to 1996. His research activities include semiconductor nano devices, and nanotechnology; self-assembly growth of quantum structures and cooperative assembly of quantum dot arrays Si-based Molecular Beam Epitaxy, quantum structures and devices; Nano-epitaxy of hetero-structures; Spintronics materials and devices; Electron spin and coherence properties of SiGe and InAs quantum structures for implementation of spin-based quantum information; microwave devices. He was the inventor of strained layer MOSFET, quantum SRAM cell, and band-aligned superlattices. He holds 45 patents and published over 700 papers. He is a passionate teacher and has mentored hundreds of students, including MS and PhD candidates. Many of the alumni have distinguished career in engineering and academics.

He is a leader in Nanotechnology. He has been the Raytheon Chair Professor of Physical Science since 2006. He serves on the editorial board of the Encyclopedia of Nanoscience and Nanotechnology TM (American Scientific publishers). He currently also serves as the Director of Marco Focus Center on Functional Engineered Nano Architectonics (FENA), an interdisciplinary Research Center, funded by Semiconductor Industry Association and Department of Defense to address the need of information processing technology beyond scaled CMOS. The Center involves 12 universities across the nation with 35 participating faculty members. He is also the Director of the Western Institute of Nanoelectronics (WIN) - a coordinated multi-project Research Institute. WIN is funded by NRI, Intel and the State of California. The current on-going projects are aimed at spintronics for low power applications.  He currently serves as the Editor-in-Chief for the IEEE Transactions on Nanotechnology (TNANO).  He was also the founding director of Nanoelectronics Research Facility at UCLA (established in 1989) with the infrastructure to further research in nanotechnology. In addition to these technical leadership contributions, he has provided academic leadership in engineering education. He was also the Dean of Engineering from 2000 to 2002 at the Hong Kong University of Science and Technology.

Research interests 
 Nanoelectronics and Nanoarchitectures
 Spintronics and Nanomagnetics
 Nanoscale Science
 Devices and Quantum Systems
 Nonvolatile Electronics and Low dissipation Devices
 Molecular Beam Epitaxy
 Optoelectronics and Solar Cells

Appointments 
2006 – Present Raytheon Chair Professor of Physical Electronics

2006 – Present Director, Western Institute of Nanoelectronics (WIN)

2011 – 2014 Editor-in-Chief, IEEE Transactions on Nanotechnology (TNANO)

2007 – 2013   Associate Director, California NanoSystems Institute (CNSI)

2003 – 2013   Director, Marco Focus Center on Functional Engineered Nano Architectonics (FENA)

2000–2002      Dean, School of Engineering, Hong Kong University of Science and Technology

1993–1996      Chair, Electrical Engineering Department, University of California, Los Angeles

1979 – Present   Professor, University of California, Los Angeles

1972–1979      Physicist/Engineer, General Electric Corporate Research and Development Center

1970–1972      Assistant Professor, Massachusetts Institute of Technology

Awards and recognition 
2018: Magnetism award and Nēel Medal, International Union of Pure and Applied Physics 

2018: Laureate of Industrial Technology Research Institute, Taiwan 

2018: Dr. Dan S. Louie lifetime achievement award  

2017: J.J. Ebers award by IEEE International Electron Devices Society 

2017: Fellow, APS (American Physical Society)

2016: Academician of Academia Sinica, Taiwan

2015: Pan Wen Yuan Outstanding Research Award, Hsinchu, Taiwan

2012: Outstanding Alumni Award of National Cheng Kung University, Taiwan

2009: Semiconductor Industry Award Research Award

2007: IBM Faculty Award

1996: Semiconductor Research Corporation Technical Excellency Award

1992: Fellow, IEEE (Institute of Electrical and Electronics)

1987-88: Guggenheim Fellow Award, Max Planck Institute, Germany

Books 
Wang, K.L. and Ovchinnikov, I., "Nanoelectronics and Nanospintronics: Fundamentals and Materials Perspective", In: Advances in Electronic Materials, Kasper, E., Mussig, H- J. and Grimmeiss, H. (Eds.), Trans Tech Publications, Switzerland, Vol. 608, pp. 133– 158 (2009)

Wang, K.L., Galatsis, K., Ostroumov, R., Ozkan, M., Likharev, K. and Botros, Y., "Chapter 10: Nanoarchitectonics: Advances in Nanoelectronics", In: Handbook of Nanoscience, Engineering, and Technology, Second Edition, Goddard, W., Brenner, D.W., Lyshevski, S.E. and Iafrate, G.J. (Eds.), CRC Press, pp. 10.1-10.24 (2007)

Eshaghian-Wilner, M. M., Flood, A. H., Khitun, A., Stoddart, J. F., Wang, K.L., "Chapter 14. Molecular and Nanoscale Computing and Technology", In: Handbook of Nature- Inspired and Innovative Computing: Integrating Classical Models with Emerging Technologies, Zomaya, A.Y. (Ed.), USA: Springer-Verlag, 477-510 (2006)

Wang, K.L. and Balandin, A.A., editors, The Handbook of Semiconductor Nanostructures and Nanodevices, America Scientific Publishers, 2005

See also
Evelyn Wang, Wang's daughter, a professor of mechanical engineering at the Massachusetts Institute of Technology

References

External links 
UCLA Device Research Laboratory
UCLA Electrical Engineering
Marco Focus Center on Functional Engineered Nano Architectonics
Westerns Institute of Nanoelectronics
IEEE Transactions on Nanotechnology

1941 births
Living people
American electrical engineers
21st-century American physicists
20th-century Taiwanese physicists
Members of Academia Sinica
National Cheng Kung University alumni
Massachusetts Institute of Technology alumni
UCLA Henry Samueli School of Engineering and Applied Science faculty
Academic staff of the Hong Kong University of Science and Technology
Fellow Members of the IEEE
21st-century Taiwanese physicists